Frederick Theodore Tavares (1913 – 1990) was an American designer, engineer, and musician who played with Bing Crosby, Dean Martin, Henry Mancini and many others, and was also a key figure at Fender Musical Instruments Corporation for many decades. Tavares is perhaps best known for his role in designing the Fender Stratocaster and other Fender instruments and amplifiers (including the classic Bassman amp).

Biography 
Frederick Theodore Tavares was born on 18 February 1913 in Maui, Hawaii. 

He was a virtuoso on the steel guitar, playing on many hundreds of recording sessions, radio broadcasts and movie soundtracks. The signature steel guitar swoop at the beginning of every Warner Bros. Looney Tunes theatrical short was played by Tavares.  His other credits include work with Ray Conniff, Bing Crosby, Elvis Presley, Dean Martin, The Sons of the Pioneers, "Tennessee" Ernie Ford, Spike Jones and His City Slickers, Lawrence Welk, and Henry Mancini. While he worked with Leo Fender and others in the design of the Stratocaster, the general consensus is that his most significant contribution to the development of that instrument was his role the design of the vibrato system.

He died 24 July 1990 in California.

References

External links
 Hawaiian Steel Guitar Association

American designers
1913 births
1990 deaths
Guitarists from Hawaii
American male guitarists
Fender people
20th-century American guitarists
American people of Native Hawaiian descent
Hawaii people of Portuguese descent
20th-century American male musicians